Tenbury Museum is a museum in the market town of Tenbury Wells, Worcestershire, England. It holds a collection of local and social history objects, plus copies of the Tenbury Advertiser newspaper dating back to 1871. 

The building was originally Goff's Free School and continued in use as a school until 1914. In 1977 it was renovated for use as a museum.

External links
Tenbury Museum website

Footnotes 

Museums in Worcestershire
Local museums in Worcestershire
Tenbury Wells